Samuel Argent Bardsley, MD (27 April 1764 – 29 May 1851), was an English physician.

Life 
Bardsley was born at Kelvdon, Essex. His medical studies were begun at Nottingham, where he passed an apprenticeship to a surgeon, and followed up at London, Edinburgh, and Leyden. He was entered of the Leyden University in August 1786, and graduated there in 1789.

After passing a short time at Doncaster he removed to Manchester in 1790, and was elected physician to the Manchester Infirmary, a position he retained until August 1823, gaining during the thirty-three years great esteem as 'the very model of an hospital physician.'

He relinquished his professional 'practice' many years before his death, which occurred on 29 May 1851, while on a visit to a friend near Hastings. He was buried at St. Saviour's Church, Manchester.

Works 
Dr Bardsley published in 1800 'Critical Remarks on the Tragedy of Pizarro, with Observations on the subject of the Drama;’ and in 1807 a volume of 'Medical Reports of Cases and Experiments, with Observations chiefly derived from Hospital practice; also an Enquiry into the Origin of Canine Madness.' To the 'Memoirs' of the Literary and Philosophical Society of Manchester, of which he was a vice-president, he contributed in 1798 a paper on 'Party Prejudice,’ and in 1803 one on 'The Use and Abuse of Popular Sports and Exercises.'

Manuscript copies of lectures given by Bardsley and taken down by his students survive within the Manchester Medical Manuscripts Collection held by special collections at the University of Manchester Library with the references MMM/7/12 and MMM/23/1/20. The collection also includes a commonplace book (MMM/3/1) created by Bardsley between 1796 and 1848 in which he comments a number of medical, political, economic, and social issues of the times.

References 

1764 births
1851 deaths
Alumni of the University of Edinburgh
18th-century English medical doctors
People from Kelvedon
19th-century English medical doctors
18th-century English writers
18th-century English male writers
19th-century English writers
British expatriates in the Netherlands
Manchester Literary and Philosophical Society